The Catholic Church in Georgia, since the 11th-century East–West Schism, has been composed mainly of Latin Church Catholics; a very large community of the Armenian Catholic Church has existed in Georgia since the 18th century.

A Georgian Greek Catholic Church, although small, has existed for a number of centuries. It has never constituted an autonomous ("sui iuris") Church, as defined by Canon 27 of the Code of Canons of the Eastern Churches, which have a hierarchy of their own and are recognized as autonomous by the supreme authority of the Church. Outside Georgia, a small parish has long existed in Istanbul, centered on Our Lady of Lourdes Church, Istanbul, founded in 1861. This was never established as a recognized particular church of any level (exarchate, ordinariate, etc.), within the communion of Catholic Churches, and accordingly has never appeared in the list of Eastern Catholic Churches published in the Annuario Pontificio.

History 
Christianity in Georgia began in earnest with the evangelization by Saint Nino in the 4th century. Georgian Christianity then developed in the Byzantine Orthodox tradition, although contact with Rome did occur. The East–West Schism did not immediately sever communion between Georgia and the Holy See, although the break was recognized by the mid-13th century.

Around this time, Catholic missionaries became active in Georgia, setting up small Latin communities. A Latin-Rite Diocese was established at Tbilisi in 1329, but this was allowed to lapse after the appointment of the fourteenth and last of its line of bishops in 1507, owing to few numbers of Catholics.

In 1626, the Theatine and Capuchin orders established new missions in Georgia. In the following centuries a community of Latin Catholics began to form, members of this community commonly being referred to as "French", which was the dominant nationality of the missionaries. Both orders were expelled by Tsar Nicholas I in 1845.

However, an agreement between Pope Pius IX and Tsar Nicholas I in 1848 permitted the establishment of the Latin-Rite Diocese of Tiraspol. This was based in Russia, but all Transcaucasian Catholics, including ethnic Georgians, were aggregated to it. The Russian part of that diocese is now called Saint Clement in Saratov.

Towards the end of the 19th century, some Georgian Catholics wished to use the Byzantine rite in Old Georgian, but were thwarted by the outlawing of Byzantine "Uniate" groups. Accordingly, since the tsars forbade their Catholic subjects to use the Byzantine Rite, and the Holy See did not promote its use among the Georgians, some of them, clergy as well as laity, adopted the Armenian Rite. There existed at that time the Armenian Catholic Diocese of Artvin, which had been set up in Russian Transcaucasia in 1850. It is now a merely titular see, listed as such in the Annuario Pontificio.

At Istanbul in 1861, ethnic Georgian and former Mekhitarist priest Fr. Peter Kharischirashvili founded the first two religious congregations of the Georgian Greek Catholic Church; the Servites of the Immaculate Conception, one for men and the other for women. They served Georgian Catholics living in the Ottoman Empire and elsewhere in the Georgian diaspora, like at Montaubon, France. Both congregations survived until the late 1950s. The building that housed the male congregation of the Servites, Fery-Quoa, still stands in Istanbul, but is now in private ownership. Their clergy gave Georgian Catholics in Constantinople the possibility to worship in the Byzantine Rite in Old Georgian, but, as is common for Eastern Catholics without a Hierarchy of their own, they were under the authority of the local Latin Catholic bishop. 

Georgian nationalist, Roman Catholic priest, and political emigre Fr. Michel Tamarati was the first to study the history of Catholicism in Georgia, eventually producing the oft-cited L'Eglise géorgienne des origines jusqu' à nos jours in French in 1911.

Only after the granting of religious freedom during the Russian Revolution of 1905 did some Georgian Catholics resume the Byzantine Rite, without reaching the stage of having a separate diocese (particular Church) established for them.

At the outbreak of the First World War, Georgian Catholics were some 50,000. About 40,000 of these were of Roman Rite, the others were mainly Armenian Catholics. Canonically, they depended on the Roman Catholic Diocese of Tiraspol, which had its headquarters at Saratov on the Volga River.

In the brief period of Georgian independence between 1918 and 1921, some influential Orthodox Georgians expressed interest in reunification with the Holy See, and an envoy was sent from the Vatican in 1919 to examine the situation. As a result of the onset of the civil war and the Soviet invasion, this came to nothing.

In 1920, it was estimated that of 40,000 Catholics in Georgia, 32,000 were Latins and the remainder of the Armenian rite.

According to Father Christopher Zugger, nine Servite missionaries from Constantinople, headed by Exarch Shio Batmanishvili, came to the newly independent Democratic Republic of Georgia to permanently establish Catholicism of the Byzantine Rite in Old Georgian there, and by 1929 their faithful had grown to 8,000. Tragically, their mission came to an end with the arrests of Exarch Shio and his priests by the Soviet secret police in 1928, their imprisonment in the Gulag at Solovki prison camp, and their subsequent murder by Joseph Stalin's NKVD at Sandarmokh in 1937.

Organisation 

After the collapse of the Soviet Union, a Latin Rite apostolic administration (pre-diocesan jurisdiction) of the Caucasus was established on 30 December 1993, with headquarters in the Georgian capital Tbilisi, with a territory including Georgia, Armenia and, until 2001, Azerbaijan. Since 1996 this has been headed by bishop Giuseppe Pasotto, who arrived in Tbilisi in 1993 and has lived in Georgia ever since. In an interview with Aid to the Church in Need, the bishop described the situation of the Catholic Church on his arrival, soon after the country had gained independence. "The only thing that was left of the Catholic Church was one open place of worship (the Church of St. Peter and St. Paul in Tbilisi). The communities that were scattered across rural areas had all been abandoned. The first thing we did was re-establish contact and then find additional priests from other countries and local churches to come and help us. And so we gradually began to rebuild the most important structures. It seems to me that the rosary saved the Catholic faith not only in Georgia, but in all Communist countries. The people came together in the houses to pray and the grandmothers were the ones who took responsibility." 

In the same interview, the bishop ranked ecumenical work as the main priority for the Church at present. "This is our first task and it is a very difficult one. Due to the legacy of its past, the Orthodox Church still has a hard time being open to this. The Catholics are well aware that they are a minority and often face discrimination and unfair treatment. You just need to remember the six churches that were confiscated and never given back, or the prohibition of interfaith marriages. The ecumenical path requires a great deal of patience and the constant search for new and potential opportunities for establishing relationships that could develop into bridges. Our university, where most of the students are non-Catholics, plays an important role in this."

Georgians of Armenian Rite are in the care of the Ordinariate for Armenian Catholics in Eastern Europe, which was established on 13 July 1991, covering a vast area including Russia and Ukraine, much vaster than Georgia, which has some 400,000 faithful in all (Annuario Pontificio 2012).

Georgian Catholics of the Byzantine rite are said to have numbered 7,000 in 2005.

Theatine and Capuchin missionaries worked for reunion in Georgia, but under Imperial Russia in 1845, Catholics were not allowed to use the Byzantine Rite. Many Catholics adopted the Armenian Rite until the institution of religious liberty in 1905, which allowed them to return to the Byzantine Rite. In 1937, the Georgian Catholic exarch, Shio Batmanishvili (or Batmalishviii), was executed by the Soviets.

Demographics and major churches 

There are approximately 80,000 Catholics in Georgia – around 2% of the total population.  They are mostly found either in Tbilisi or in the southern region of the country, where exclusively Catholic villages exist.  There are three Catholic churches in Tbilisi; the Cathedral of Our Lady in the old town, the parish church of St Peter and St Paul, and Mar Shimon Bar Sabbae Assyrian Chaldean Catholic Church in Saburtalo. A Neocatechumenal Way Mission involving priests, families in mission and lay persons has been present in Sts Peter and Paul church since 1991, helping and leading the parish.

The Catholics in Tbilisi are mostly Georgians and Armenians, as well as a small Assyrian community of the Chaldean Rite.

This church also provides mass in English, catering for the growing Catholic expatriate population of Americans, Europeans, Indians and Maltese.  There are only about 1000 practicing Catholics in Tbilisi.  Many other Catholic churches were confiscated by the Georgian Orthodox Church  after the fall of communism when the state gave all church property back to the Georgian Orthodox church.  Recently, a new seminary has been completed on the outskirts of Tbilisi

A Catholic church is also present in Sukhumi, in Abkhazia.  Other Catholic Churches are found in Vale, Gori and in Batumi.

See also 
 List of Catholic dioceses in Georgia
 Notre-Dame-de-Lourdes Georgian Catholic church in Bomonti, Şişli, Istanbul

References

Bibliography

External links 
 Official site for Catholics in Georgia

 
Eastern Catholic Churches
Georgia